Arkas is the pen name of a popular Greek comics artist that began working in early 1981. His comics have a unique style, often combining humor and deep philosophical questions. The structure of the stories are generally very simple with each volume being made up of individual strips which follow some general plot guidelines. Most of the times we will only see two main characters: One is the rational, skeptical and questioning figure, while the other is a rude, vulgar or just empty-headed character who usually provides the punchlines. The stories take place in a variety of different locations/situations with protagonists that are usually animals but humans and occasionally video-game characters are also featured.

Arkas seldom appears at conventions and generally avoids publicity and appearances on television shows or interviews, as he has been quoted to believe that the artist should be known through his work, not through personal promotion. A mystery has been created around his identity and his real name still remains unknown, although the Greek newspaper Kathimerini has also mentioned it as Antonis Evdemon. According to fan rumors, he is a psychiatrist, possibly a university professor.

Arkas in Greek means Arcadian or someone from the province of Arcadia. However, the CamelCase style in which his name is written suggests that Arkas may be only his initials. Arkas has been translated into other languages and has become known outside Greece. Translations of his books can be found in English, French, German, Romanian, Spanish, Portuguese, Italian, Bulgarian, Polish and Serbian.

Works

Comic book titles
 O κόκκορας / The rooster – 1981
 Show business – 1983
 Ξυπνάς μέσα μου το ζώο / You bring out the animal in me – 1985
 Μετά την καταστροφή / After the destruction – 1986
 Φάε το κερασάκι / Eat the cherry – 1987
 Ο Παντελής και το λιοντάρι / Pantelis and the lion – 1987
 Αταίριαστοι έρωτες / Ιncongruous love – 1988
 Ο ισοβίτης / The lifer – 1989
 Χαμηλές πτήσεις / Low flights – 1991
 Καστράτο / Castrato – 1995
 Πειραματόζωα / Lab animals – 1998
 Ο καλός λύκος / The big good wolf – 1998
 Η ζωή μετά / The afterlife – 1999
 Οι συνομήλικοι / Peers
 Θηρία ενήμερα / Informed beasts 
 Το μικρό και το μεγάλο / The small and the big
 Επικίνδυνα νερά / Dangerous waters

CD albums
Ξυπνάς μέσα μου το ζώο / You bring out the animal in me – 1997

Theatre plays 
Εχθροί Εξ Αίματος / Blood Enemies – 2007
Βιολογικός Μετανάστης / Biological Immigrant – 2011

References

External links

His profile in Lambiek Comiclopedia

Living people
20th-century Greek artists
21st-century Greek artists
20th-century Greek writers
21st-century Greek writers
20th-century Greek male writers
21st-century Greek male writers
Pseudonymous artists
Greek comics artists
Greek comics writers
1958 births
20th-century pseudonymous writers
21st-century pseudonymous writers